"The Posse (Shoot 'Em Up)" is the first single released from Tragedy Khadafi's (then known as Intelligent Hoodlum) second album, Tragedy: Saga of a Hoodlum, and also the single released for the Posse (1993) OST.

Single track listing
"The Posse (Shoot 'Em Up)"
"The Posse (Shoot 'Em Up) (Instrumental)"

References

1993 singles
Tragedy Khadafi songs
1993 songs
A&M Records singles